Jérôme-Michel-Francis Martin O.F.M. Cap. (10 June 1941–4 December 2009) was the Roman Catholic bishop of the Roman Catholic Diocese of Berbérati, Central African Republic.

Ordained to the priesthood on 29 June 1967, Martin was appointed bishop on 3 October 1987 and was ordained on 24 January 1988 resigning on 17 June 1991.

Notes

1941 births
2009 deaths
People from Mambéré-Kadéï
Capuchin bishops
20th-century Roman Catholic bishops in the Central African Republic
Roman Catholic bishops of Berbérati